Omphalotus mangensis is a species of agaric fungus in the family Marasmiaceae.  Found in China, the fruit bodies of the fungus are bioluminescent.

See also 
List of bioluminescent fungi

References

External links 

mangensis
Bioluminescent fungi
Fungi described in 1993
Fungi of China